Payam-i-Mashriq (or Message from the East; published in Persian, 1923) is a philosophical poetry book of Allama Iqbal, the great poet-philosopher of British India.

Introduction

Payam-i-Mashriq is an answer to West-östlicher Diwan by Goethe, the famous German poet.

History
Immediately after the end of World War I, Iqbal started writing the Payam and it can be presumed that he would have thought in this respect to achieve a goal of bringing the East and the West closer to each other.

It is evident from some of Iqbal's Urdu letters that he first disclosed about his book-in-preparation (i.e. Payam) to Syed Sulaiman Nadwi, a distinguished scholar and his esteemed friend, in 1919:

"At present, I am writing a reply to the Divan of a Western poet (i.e. Goethe) and about half of it has been completed. Some poems will be in Persian and some in Urdu..... Two great German poets, Goethe and Uhland, were barristers. After practising for a short time Goethe was appointed as an educational adviser to the state of Wiemar and, thus, found much time to pay attention to his artistic intricacies. Uhland devoted his whole life to the law suits, and, therefore, he could write a few poems."

The relevant excerpts from other letters are the following:

"Now I am writing a collection of Persian poetry in response to Goethe’s Divan and its one third part has been written.... I believe that this collection will be translated, because in it every aspect of Europe’s intellectual life has been regarded, and it will be tried to warm a bit the cold thoughts and ideas of the West."

"In response to Goethe, I have written Payam-i-Mashriq that is near completion. I hope that it will be published before the end of this year."

"In response to the Eastern Divan of Goethe (a German poet) I have written a collection of Persian verses. It will soon be printed. In the preface, I shall try to show how Persian literature has influenced German literature."

"I have written Payam-i-Mashriq in reply to Western Divan of Goethe, a famous German poet. It is in print. I believe, you will like it."

Because of these personal remarks and its pre-publication coverage in the literary journals, Payam gained much popularity and the intellectuals as well as the common readers waited impatiently to see it in printed form. Finally, in May 1923, its first edition came out and was warmly received by the masses. Payam was presented to the public with the intention of "warming the cold thoughts and ideas of the West." In the preface, Iqbal himself had outlined the objective of this most important collection of Persian poetry in these words:

"I need hardly say anything about the Payam-i-Mashriq which has been written a hundred years after the Western Divan. The reader will himself see that its main object is to bring out those social, moral, and religious truths which have a bearing on the spiritual development of individuals and communities. There is a certain amount of similarity between the East of today and the Germany of a hundred years ago. The fact, however, is that the inner turmoil which the nations of the world are going through today, and which we are unable to regard objectively inasmuch as we ourselves are affected by it, is the forerunner of a social and spiritual revolution of very great magnitude. The Great War of Europe was a catastrophe which has almost wholly destroyed the old world order. Out of the ashes of civilisation and culture, nature is now building up a new humanity and a new world for that humanity to live in. We can catch a glimpse of the new world order in the works of Professor Einstein and Bergson. Europe has seen with its own eyes the dreadful consequences of its scientific, moral, and economic pursuits and has also heard from Signor Nitti (a former Prime Minister of Italy) the heartrending story of the decadence of the West. It is a matter for regret, however, that the intelligent but conservative statesmen of Europe have not been able to comprehend the real significance of the revolution that has taken place in the human spirit. From the purely literary point of view, the weakening of the life potentialities of Europe after the painful happenings of the World War is detrimental to the development of a sound and mature literary ideal. There is, indeed, a danger that the minds of nations may not be subjugated by that time-worn and devitalising escapist mentality which cannot differentiate between the thoughts of the head and the feelings of the heart.....

The East, and particularly the Muslim East, has opened its eyes after having slumbered for centuries. The Eastern people have, however, realised that life cannot effect a revolution in its environment before it has had, in the first instance, a revolution in the inner depths of its own being, nor can a new world assume external form until its existence takes shape in the hearts of men. That immutable law of the Universe which the Quran has enunciated in the simple but comprehensive verse:

"God does not change the destiny of people unless they change themselves." [xiii. 11]

holds good for the individual as well as the collective aspects of life. In my Persian works I have tried to keep this truth in mind."

The Payam has been very rightly acclaimed as "a genuine attempt by an eminent Eastern poet, endowed with knowledge of Western literature and thought....to enter into a dialogue with Europe." The work includes a collection of quatrains, followed by a group of poems setting forth Iqbal's philosophy of life in lyrical form and some poetical sketches that picture European poets, philosophers, and politicians.

See also 
 Index of Muhammad Iqbal–related articles
 Javid Nama
 Zabur-i-Ajam
 Pas Chih Bayad Kard ay Aqwam-i-Sharq
 Bang-e-Dara
 Bal-e-Jibril
 Asrar-i-Khudi
 Rumuz-e-Bekhudi
 Zarb-i-Kalim
 Armaghan-i-Hijaz

Notes

External links

Related Websites
 Official Website of Allama Iqbal
 Iqbal Cyber Library, Online Library
 The collection of Urdu poems: Columbia University
 Encyclopedia Britannica.
 Allama Iqbal Urdu Poetry Collection
 Allama Iqbal Searchable Books (iqbal.wiki)
 
 
 E-Books of Allama Iqbal on Rekhta
Social Media Pages
 Facebook Page of Allama Iqbal
 Twitter Account of Allama Iqbal
YouTube Channel
 YouTube Channel of Allama Iqbal

1923 books
Persian poems
Islamic philosophical poetry books
Poetry by Muhammad Iqbal
Poetry collections
Books by Muhammad Iqbal